Paruchuri (Telugu: పరుచూరి) is one of the clans/surnames of the Kamma community, found largely in Andhra Pradesh and to some extent in United States, UK, Tamil Nadu and Karnataka.

This clan belongs to the "Pedda Kammas", descendants of Nayaks and ruling clans, who form the uppermost strata of the Kammas.  Paruchuri Kethi Nayakudu claimed Durjaya/Kondapadamati Budhavarma lineage.

See also

 Paruchuri Brothers
 Paruchuri Venkateswara Rao
 Paruchuri Gopala Krishna
 Kamma (caste)
 Paruchuru

References

External links
 "Kammavari Charitra" (in Telugu language) by Kotha Bhavaiah Chowdary, 1939. Revised Edition (2006), Pavuluri Publishers, Guntur
 Kamma surnames

Indian surnames
Telugu-language surnames